Grachan Moncur III (June 3, 1937 – June 3, 2022) was an American jazz trombonist. He was the son of jazz bassist Grachan Moncur II and the nephew of jazz saxophonist Al Cooper.

Biography
Born in New York City, United States, (his paternal grandfather was from the Bahamas) and raised in Newark, New Jersey, Grachan Moncur III began playing the cello at the age of nine, and switched to the trombone when he was 11. In high school, he attended the Laurinburg Institute in North Carolina, the private school where Dizzy Gillespie had studied. While still at school, he began sitting in with touring jazz musicians on their way through town, including Art Blakey and Jackie McLean, with whom he formed a lasting friendship.

After high school, Moncur toured with Ray Charles (1959–62), Art Farmer and Benny Golson's Jazztet (1962), and Sonny Rollins.  He took part in two Jackie McLean albums for Blue Note in 1963, One Step Beyond and Destination... Out!, to which he also contributed the bulk of compositions. He recorded two albums of his own for Blue Note, Evolution (1963) with Jackie McLean and Lee Morgan, and Some Other Stuff (1964) with Herbie Hancock and Wayne Shorter.

Moncur joined Archie Shepp's ensemble, and recorded with other avant-garde players such as Marion Brown, Beaver Harris and Roswell Rudd (another free jazz trombonist). During a stay in Paris in the summer of 1969, he recorded two albums as a leader for the BYG Actuel label, New Africa and Aco Dei de Madrugada, as well as appearing as a sideman on other releases of the label. In 1974, the Jazz Composer's Orchestra commissioned him to write Echoes of Prayer (1974), a jazz symphony featuring a full orchestra plus vocalists and jazz soloists. His sixth album as a leader, Shadows (1977) was released only in Japan. Unfortunately, he was subsequently plagued by health problems and copyright disputes and recorded only rarely. Through the 1980s, he recorded with Cassandra Wilson (1985), played occasionally with the Paris Reunion Band and Frank Lowe, appeared on Big John Patton's Soul Connection (1983), but mostly concentrated on teaching.  In 2004, he re-emerged with a new album, Exploration, on Capri Records featuring Moncur's compositions arranged by Mark Masters for an octet including Tim Hagans and Gary Bartz.

Moncur died from cardiac arrest on June 3, 2022, his 85th birthday, at his home in Newark, New Jersey.

Discography

As a leader 
 Evolution (Blue Note, 1963)
 Some Other Stuff (Blue Note, 1964)
 "Blue Free" and "The Intellect" on The New Wave in Jazz (Impulse!, 1965)
 The New Breed (The Dedication Series/Vol.VXIII) Sides C and D-1 (Impulse, 1978 [recorded 1965])
 New Africa (BYG Actuel, 1969)
 Aco Dei de Madrugada (One Morning I Waked Up Very Early) (BYG Actuel, 1969)
 Echoes of Prayer (JCOA, 1974)
 Shadows (Denon, 1977)
 Exploration (Capri, 2004)
 Inner Cry Blues (Lunar Module, 2007)

As a sideman 
with Marion Brown:
 Juba-Lee (Fontana, 1967)
 Three for Shepp (Impulse!, 1967)

with Dave Burrell:
 Echo (BYG Actuel, 1969)
 La Vie de Bohème (BYG Actuel, 1970)

with Benny Golson:
 Here and Now (Mercury, 1962) – with Art Farmer 
 Another Git Together (Mercury, 1962) – with Art Farmer
 Pop + Jazz = Swing (Audio Fidelity, 1962) – later version as Just Jazz!
 Stockholm Sojourn (Prestige, 1965)

with Herbie Hancock:
 My Point of View (Blue Note, 1963)

with Beaver Harris:
 Safe (Red, 1979)
 Beautiful Africa (Soul Note, 1979)
 Live at Nyon (Cadence Jazz, 1981)

with Joe Henderson:
 The Kicker (Milestone, 1967)

with Khan Jamal:
 Black Awareness (CIMP, 2005)

with Frank Lowe:
 Decision in Paradise (Soul Note, 1985)

with Jackie McLean:
 One Step Beyond (Blue Note, 1963)
 Destination... Out! (Blue Note, 1964)
 'Bout Soul (Blue Note, 1967)
 Hipnosis (Blue Note, 1967)

with Lee Morgan:
 The Last Session (Blue Note, 1971)

with Butch Morris:
 In Touch... but out of Reach (Kharma, 1982)

with Sunny Murray:
 Homage to Africa (BYG Actuel, 1969)

with Sunny Murray, Khan Jamal and Romulus:
 Change of the Century Orchestra (JAS, 1999)

with Paris Reunion Band:
 For Klook (Gazell, 1987)

with William Parker:
 In Order to Survive (Black Saint, 1995)

with John Patton:
 Soul Connection (Nilva, 1983)

with The Reunion Legacy Band:
 The Legacy (Early Bird, 1991)

with Archie Shepp:
 Mama Too Tight (Impulse!, 1966)
 The Way Ahead (album) (Impulse!, 1968)
 Poem for Malcolm (BYG Actuel, 1969)
 For Losers (Impulse!, 1970)
 Things Have Got to Change (Impulse!, 1971)
 Live at the Pan-African Festival (BYG Actuel, 1971)
 Life at the Donaueschingen Festival (MPS, 1972)
 Kwanza (Impulse!, 1974)
 Freedom (JMY, 1991)

with Archie Shepp and Roswell Rudd:
 Live in New York (Verve, 2001)

with Wayne Shorter:
 The All Seeing Eye (Blue Note, 1965)

with Alan Silva:
 Luna Surface (BYG Actuel, 1969)

with Clifford Thornton:
 Ketchaoua (BYG Actuel, 1969)with Chris White: The Chris White Project (Muse, 1993) with Cassandra Wilson:' Point of View'' (JMT, 1986)

References

External links 
 Grachan Moncur at MySpace.
 "A Fireside Chat With Grachan Moncur III", All About Jazz, January 17, 2003.
 Peter Marsh, "Grachan Moncur III Exploration", BBC Review, 2005.
 Andrew Durkin, "Grachan Moncur III: Exploration", All About Jazz, March 21, 2005.
 Grachan Moncur III music and papers, Institute of Jazz Studies, Rutgers University.
 
 

1937 births
2022 deaths
20th-century African-American musicians
21st-century African-American musicians
American people of Bahamian descent
Musicians from New York City
Avant-garde jazz musicians
American jazz trombonists
Male trombonists
Free jazz trombonists
BYG Actuel artists
Blue Note Records artists
Musicians from Newark, New Jersey
Jazz musicians from New York (state)
21st-century trombonists
21st-century American male musicians
American male jazz musicians
The 360 Degree Music Experience members
The Jazztet members